The Rishworth branch was built in the Ryburn valley by the Lancashire and Yorkshire Railway and linked  with  and served the villages of Triangle, Ripponden, Barkisland and Rishworth.

History

A branch from Sowerby Bridge to Ripponden was authorised in 1865, with an extension to Rishworth authorised in 1871. The line opened as far as Ripponden in 1878 and to Rishworth in 1881. The branch line was closed to passengers on 8 July 1929. The section between Rishworth and Ripponden closed for freight in 1953 and Ripponden to Sowerby Bridge closed completely on 1 September 1958.

Route

The line left  a little to the east of the station, diverging south. From Triangle to  the gradient increased to 1 in 60.

Present day

Part of the trackbed is now a permissive bridleway. A section of the line south west from Ripponden village is a permissive footpath.

References

Further reading
 

Railway lines opened in 1881
Closed railway lines in Yorkshire and the Humber
1881 establishments in England
Transport in Calderdale